Al-Shaykh Maskin, also spelled Sheikh Maskīn, Sheikh Miskeen, is a town in southern Syria, administratively part of the Daraa Governorate, located north of Daraa. Nearby localities include Ibta' and Da'el to the south, Khirbet al-Ghazaleh the southeast, Izra' to the northeast, Nawa to the northwest and Al-Shaykh Saad to the west. According to the Central Bureau of Statistics (CBS) census, al-Shaykh Maskin had a population of 24,057 in 2004. The inhabitants are predominantly Sunni Muslims.

Name
Clermont-Ganneau theorised that the town's name came from "The leper Sheik", that is Biblical Job.

History

Roman and Byzantine periods
Al-Shaykh Maskin has been identified as the ancient Roman-era site of "Neapolis." By the 4th-century, Neapolis had grown to become a city.

A church was consecrated there in 517 during Byzantine rule. In his short article in the Catholic Encyclopedia of 1911, Siméon Vailhé reported that many authorities at that time thought that Al-Shaykh Maskin might be the site of the ancient city and bishopric of Maximianopolis in Arabia, whose identification with nearby Shaqqa is today accepted.

Ottoman period
The Ottoman Empire annexed the region in 1516. During this period al-Shaykh Maskin was settled by local Bedouin tribesmen and benefited from the annual hajj pilgrimage to Mecca by supplying pilgrim caravans with camels for transportation. In 1596 al-Shaykh Maskin appeared in the Ottoman tax registers as Samsakin and was part of the nahiya of Bani Malik al-Asraf in the Qada Hawran. It had an entirely Muslim population consisting of 56 households and 17 bachelors. A fixed tax rate of 40% was paid on wheat, barley, summer crops, goats and/or beehives; a total of 17,250 akçe. 1/3 of the revenue went to a waqf.

In the 1850s al-Shaykh Maskin contained about 100 houses and all of its inhabitants were Muslims. The town's chief commodity during the 19th-century was grain, which it exported locally. Timber and cloth were the principal imports. Goods traffic was concentrated in the town's railway station which also served all the villages between Sheikh Maskin and the Lajat region. In the It grew considerably between 1891 and 1900. The town hosted the administrative offices of Hauran's local government in the latter half of this century. The population was "exclusively Muslim" according to John Murray.

Its sheikh ("chief") was Ahmed al-Hariri also known as Ahmed al-Turk who served as the Sheikh Mushaikh al-Hauran ("chief of chiefs of the Hauran"). His tribe claimed descent from the family of the Islamic prophet Muhammad and were thus known as sharifs. In the wake of the 1860 confrontations between the region's Druze and Christians, Sheikh Ahmed al-Turk led a force of 200 tribesmen to Daraa, rescuing the over 500 Christians in that town from an impending attack by the Druze of the Lejah who his forces successfully routed. He subsequently notified all the tribal chieftains of the area to spare the Christians living in the towns under his authority, to which all the tribes conformed.

In 1895 al-Shaykh Maskin became a refuge for the residents of some dozen villages destroyed by Druze fighters in response to an Ottoman decree ordering the conscription of Druze men into the Ottoman army. Ottoman troops mobilized at al-Shaykh Maskin in preparation of the conscription expedition against the Druze which was launched from the town on 15 October. Vital Cuinet wrote in 1896 that al-Shaykh Maskin's population of 800 included 400 Muslims and 400 Greek Orthodox, while Gottlieb Schumacher described it in 1897 as "large and prosperous".

Syrian Civil War
The town was under rebels′ control as a result of the battle of Al-Shaykh Maskin at the end of 2014.

Second Battle of Al-Shaykh Maskin

Early on 27 December, the 15th Brigade of the 5th Armoured Division of the Syrian Army launched the operation to capture Al-Shaykh Maskin, attacking its northern and eastern flanks. Over the following two days, the Russian air force conducted over 80 air-strikes on the town.

On 29 December, the Army captured the Brigade 82 military base, on the outskirts of Al-Shaykh Maskin, as well as the northern part of the town itself. Government forces then temporarily lost the base due to bad weather, but retook it again overnight. The following day, government forces continued with their attempts to take full control of Al-Shaykh Maskin and captured the eastern part of the town. This left them in control of half of Al-Shaykh Maskin. They reached the town's main square, as well as the Al-'Umari Mosque (north of the city center), while the rebels issued a distress call for reinforcements. The Army's advances were supported by another 15 Russian air-strikes.

Further attempts by the Army to advance were made between 2 and 4 January, as 43 more Russian air-strikes hit the town.

Failed rebel counter-attack 
On 5 January, the rebels launched a counter-attack towards the Brigade 82 base. At the same time, the 15th Brigade, supported by NDF units, continued making attempts to advance to Tal Hamad hill, west of the town, but were unsuccessful. By this point, the military was in control of 55–60% of Al-Shaykh Maskin. By the evening, the rebel counter-attack stalled. The next day, the rebels renewed their counter-assault and stormed the southern perimeter of the Brigade 82 headquarters. However, eventually, this second assault failed as well. The Russian Air Force conducted 12 air-strikes throughout the day.

A third unsuccessful rebel assault was launched on the morning of 8 January, against the walls of the Brigade 82 Housing Facility. Rebel fighters were hampered by poor weather, fierce resistance and Russian air-strikes. Opposition sources confirmed that since the start of the battle for Al-Shaykh Maskin the rebels had suffered ”major material and human losses", but reported they were still preparing to make new attempts to regain the base.

The Syrian Army captures Al-Shaykh Maskin 
Between 9 and 10 January, 33 air-strikes were conducted against Al-Shaykh Maskin.

On 11 January, government forces captured a total of 17 buildings in the southern part of the city and two days later, another 35 buildings, thus seizing the southern part of the town, and leaving them in control of 80 percent of Al-Shaykh Maskin.

Between 23 and 24 January, the military captured Al-Zaheriyah school and its surrounding area, as well as the town of Al-Burj on the outskirts of Al-Shaykh Maskin, after more than 40 air-strikes were conducted. However, the rebels were able to recapture the school. Still, Army advances continued as they took control of more positions in the town, which included the Al-Bassam Mosque, parts of the Al-Diri neighborhood and large sections of the Saydaliyat road.

During the night before 25 January, when the final Army assault was supposed to commence, a military detachment was sent to capture a height overlooking the town, from which the rebels could detect the military's planned attack from the north of the town. The fighting was heavy, but a heavy rain helped the Army unit climb up the height without being detected. The unit was then attacked from three sides, during which its commander, Mohammed Fares, was wounded. The detachment managed to hold the height until reinforcements arrived.

The next morning, the Syrian Army launched its operation from the north side of the town and rapidly advanced, linking up with troops coming in from the east. The fighting started 08:30 am, and shortly thereafter the SAA's 15th Brigade captured the Al-'Umari Mosque. The military made gains in the northwestern neighborhood of Al-Shaykh Maskin, as well as other parts of the town, while they were covered by 25 air-strikes. The heaviest fighting of the day took place in the Al-Diri District. However, after seizing Al-Diri, the rebels were left with only two building blocks under their control. The Army's advances also enabled them to monitor all roads leading from the town to other nearby areas. Many rebels started withdrawing from the town, mainly towards Ibta' and Nawa. By 10:30 pm, the military had cleared Al-Shaykh Maskin of all rebel resistance. By the end of the battle, 70% of the city had been rendered uninhabitable.

References

Bibliography

External links
 Map of the town, Google Maps 
Cheikh Meskine-map; 21L

Populated places in Izra' District
Towns in Syria